Cornplanter Run is a  tributary to Oil Creek in northwestern Pennsylvania in the United States.

Course
 Cornplanter Run rises just south of Fosters Corner and flows south to join Oil Creek just north of the city limits of Oil City, Pennsylvania.

Calaboose Run joins this creek about half-way through its course on the left.

Cornplanter Run is a second order stream at its mouth with Oil Creek.

Watershed
 Cornplanter Run drains 3.3 square miles (8.45 square km) and has an average annual flow of 5.99 cfs (cubic feet/second). 

Rainfall averages 44.53 inches (1,130.99 mm) per year.  About 83% of the watershed is forested.

References

Rivers of Venango County, Pennsylvania
Rivers of Pennsylvania
Tributaries of the Allegheny River